Astronium lecointei (Portuguese common name muiracatiara) is a timber tree, which is native to Brazil.

References

External links
 Astronium lecointei photos of wood

lecointei
Trees of the Amazon
Trees of Brazil
Taxa named by Adolpho Ducke